Margaret, Countess of Lennox was the daughter of Domhnall, Earl of Lennox, who died in about 1364. She married Walter de Fasselane, a cousin, who also descended from previous Earls of Lennox.

Margaret and Walter's children were:
Donnchadh, Earl of Lennox
Alexander
Alan
Walter

Notes

1364 deaths
Year of birth unknown
Mormaers of Lennox
Scottish countesses
14th-century Scottish earls